Donoratico is a town in Tuscany, central Italy, administratively a frazione of the comune of Castagneto Carducci, province of Livorno.

The town is about 52 km from Livorno and 4 km from Castagneto Carducci.

Main sights 
 Castle of Donoratico (10th century), in ruins

Bibliography

External links 
 

Cities and towns in Tuscany
Frazioni of the Province of Livorno